The 2nd Secretariat of the Communist Party of Cuba (PCC) was elected in 1980 by the 1st Plenary Session of the 2nd Central Committee in the immediate aftermath of the 2nd Congress.

Officers

Members

References

Specific

Bibliography
Articles and journals:
 

2nd Secretariat of the Communist Party of Cuba
1980 establishments in Cuba
1986 disestablishments in Cuba